The Boeing Championship at Sandestin was a golf tournament on the Champions Tour. It was last played in Sandestin, Florida at the Raven Golf Club. Boeing was the main sponsor of the tournament.

The purse for the 2007 tournament was US$1,650,000, with $247,500 going to the winner. The tournament was founded in 1995 as the Emerald Coast Classic. It was last played in 2007.

Winners
The Boeing Championship at Sandestin
2007 Loren Roberts
2006 Bobby Wadkins

Blue Angels Classic
2005 Jim Thorpe
2004 Tom Jenkins

Emerald Coast Classic
2003 Bob Gilder
2002 Dave Eichelberger
2001 Mike McCullough
2000 Gil Morgan
1999 Bob Duval
1998 Dana Quigley
1997 Isao Aoki
1996 Lee Trevino
1995 Raymond Floyd

Source:

References

External links
Official website
PGATOUR.com Tournament website

Former PGA Tour Champions events
Golf in Florida
Recurring sporting events established in 1995
Recurring sporting events disestablished in 2007
1995 establishments in Florida
2007 disestablishments in Florida